Bredell is a surname. Notable people with the surname include:

Anton Bredell (born 1965), South African politician
Elwood Bredell (1884–1976), British cinematographer and actor
Mark Bredell (born 1972), South African cricketer